In response to the spread of the COVID-19 pandemic in Italy in March 2020, many countries and regions imposed quarantine measures or entry bans for citizens or tourists from Italy.

Travel restrictions 

On 23 February 2020, Austria suspended all trains to and from Italy for a few hours because of suspected cases. Romania instituted a quarantine for people arriving from Lombardy and Veneto.

On 24 February, an Alitalia flight from Rome arriving at Mauritius was blocked by the local authorities, who imposed quarantine or repatriation. Of the 212 passengers, 172 were allowed to disembark while 40 passengers returned to Italy. An intercity bus operated by Flixbus from Milan to Lyon was quarantined at Gare de Lyon-Perrache station for health screening.

Brazil added Italy to its COVID-19 alert list for passenger medical checkups. Argentina, France, Croatia, Egypt, Greece, Ireland, Israel, Latvia, Lithuania, Ukraine, Serbia and South Africa issued multiple recommendations that included postponement of school trips to Italy, a 14-day quarantine for people arriving from Lombardy and Veneto and a warning for all citizens to not to travel to regions of Italy affected by the outbreak. A joint WHO and ECDC mission arrived in Italy to support COVID-19 control and prevention efforts. Following the discovery of a case involving an Italian citizen, the H10 Costa Adeje Palace in Tenerife was put on lockdown.

The European Parliament's Director General for Personnel, Kristian Knudsen, requested that staff who had travelled to areas affected by the COVID-19 outbreak, including parts of Italy, China, Singapore, and South Korea, to self-quarantine at home for 14 days.

On 25 February, the United Kingdom and Malta recommended that travellers coming from Italy self-quarantine for 14 days and for all citizens not to travel to regions of Italy affected by the outbreak. Malta installed thermal-scanning devices to monitor passengers arriving via Malta International Airport, as well as passengers disembarking from vessels at the Grand Harbour and the Virtu Ferries catamaran terminal in Marsa, which had direct connections to Pozzalo and Catania in Sicily. Prague International Airport introduced special arrival gates for selective screening of passengers arriving on flights from Italy. Kuwait, Iraq, Jordan and Seychelles suspended all flights to and from Italy. Bulgaria suspended all flights to and from Milan until 27 March. Australia, Saudi Arabia, Netherlands and the United States issued a travel advisory for all citizens not to travel to parts of Italy affected by the outbreak.

Two Flixbus buses via Italy were stopped at the Croatian border for a few hours as the passengers underwent health checks.

Goldman Sachs, Deloitte, Citigroup Inc, Credit Suisse, Lazard Capital Markets, Crédit Agricole, Nomura Holdings, Banque Populaire and BNP Paribas requested that staff who had recently returned from Italy to conduct remote work for at least 14 days and deferred non-essential travel to Italy.

On 26 February, the European Parliament postponed internships until 1 October for 35 trainees who declared residence addresses in affected regions of Italy. Six American universities — Elon University, Fairfield University, Florida International University, New York University, Stanford University and Syracuse University — postponed or cancelled their study-abroad programmes in Italy, mainly in Florence.

Russia, Spain and Turkey issued a recommendation for all citizens not to travel to affected regions of Italy. El Salvador barred the entry of travellers arriving from Italy.

The chief executive of the Irish Rugby Football Union, Philip Browne, cancelled Six Nations Championship rugby matches between Ireland and Italy from 6 to 8 March in Dublin.

On 27 February, Israel barred entry to foreign nationals travelling from Italy. Officials at Ramon Airport refused to let 25 foreign nationals arriving on a Ryanair flight from Bergamo to disembark. Israelis were allowed to enter and had to quarantine at home for 14 days. After being denied permission to dock in Ocho Rios, Jamaica and George Town, Cayman Islands on 26 February, the MSC Meraviglia, operated by MSC Cruises, was finally able to dock in Cozumel, Mexico. The cruise liner was carrying 4,500 passengers and 1,600 crew members, one of whom was reportedly showing flu-like symptoms. Another Italian cruise liner, the Costa Favolosa, which was denied permission to dock at Tortola, British Virgin Islands on 26 February, was finally able to berth in Sint Maarten. The final two stages of the UAE Tour were cancelled after two Italian staff members of one of the teams tested positive for SARS-CoV-2. Following this discovery, the W Abu Dhabi and the Crowne Plaza Abu Dhabi, both on Yas Island, were put on lockdown.

On 28 February, Germany enacted new health security measures for international arrivals including Italy.

On 29 February, the United States Centers for Disease Control and Prevention upgraded the status of Italy to Level 3 (guidance to avoid non-essential travel because of widespread community transmission). Multiple companies such as Amazon, Google, TD Bank Group, Bank of Nova Scotia, London Stock Exchange Group and Cargill, Inc. deferred all non-essential travel to countries affected by major virus outbreak, including Italy. The University of Notre Dame ended its Rome Global Gateway programme and evacuated 106 students from Rome.

On 3 March 2020, India suspended all visas to nationals of Italy, as well as visa to foreign nationals who have travelled to Italy on or after 1 February 2020. Passengers arriving directly or indirectly from Italy must undergo medical screening at the port of entry.

On 4 March, Thailand declared that people travelling from Italy must be quarantined for 14 days after arriving, with no exceptions.

On 8 March, Romania declared that people travelling from Italy must be quarantined for 14 days after arriving on a connecting flight or by road, with no exceptions, and suspended flights from Italy from 9 to 23 March.

On 10 March, Slovenia barred entry to foreign nationals travelling from Italy. On same day also Austria barred entry to foreign nationals travelling from Italy with exception for people with medical documents and people who travel only through Austria to Germany without stop in Austria.

On 18 March, Nigeria placed an indefinite suspension on all flights coming from Italy with immediate effect.

Export restrictions and aid received

The Italian government asked for medical equipment from the European Union mechanism of civil protection, and on 11 March 2020 complained about the slow response of the other European countries. The Italian Permanent Representative to the European Union, Maurizio Massari, wrote: "unfortunately, not a single EU country responded to the Commission's call."  Eventually, Germany, France and Austria donated millions of protective masks to Italy, however aid arrived from non-EU countries like China, Russia and Cuba before it arrived from any other EU country.

The lack of masks became an issue during the peak of the emergency, partly because of the requisitions of imported goods bought by Italy in transport hubs in other countries such as Poland and Turkey. Masks were confiscated by mistake in Czechia. It was happen during a raid against Chinese reseller Zhou Lingjian.

Since early March, the German government restricted the export of products essential to its national health service. Italian distributors were advised they could not be supplied with surgical gowns, protective masks, glasses, particulate respirators, nor visors. France also imposed similar export restrictions and the German health minister Jens Spahn defended Germany's decision. On 12 March, the German ministry issued a decree suspending the export restriction in particular emergency cases, and promised to send one million protective masks to Italy.

On 13 March, a team of nine Chinese experts, among whom there was the manager of the 40,000 Chinese doctors who had been sent to Wuhan and a cardio-pulmonary reanimation doctor, arrived in Rome to share their expertise. The Chinese Red Cross brought 31 tons of respiratory devices, electrocardiographs, 40 ventilators, tens of thousands of masks, and other medical equipment supplied by the hospital of the School of Medicine of Shanghai Jiaotong University. While the head of the Italian Red Cross, Francesco Rocca said these medical supplies were donated by the Chinese Red Cross, other sources claimed that these were paid products and services. Chinese billionaire and Alibaba co-founder Jack Ma also donated 500,000 masks and other medical supplies, which landed at Liege Airport in Belgium on 13 March and were then sent to Italy.

On 17 March, Undersecretary at the Ministry of Health, Sandra Zampa announced the purchase of many new ventilators as well as the importing of one and a half million masks from South Africa.

The Agnelli family donated €10 million to the Government's coronavirus funds. The family's companies Fiat and Ferrari also brought 150 ventilators and offered to help make new ventilator units, in addition to providing a fleet of vehicles to be used to distribute food and medical supplies to the elderly.

On 21 March, the Cuban government sent 52 medical staff (35 doctors and 17 nurses) specialised in infectious diseases who had dealt with the Ebola outbreak. They arrived in Milan on 22 March and entered service in Cremona on 24 March.

On 21 March, US Secretary of State Mike Pompeo said that the United States Air Force "sent a C-130 filled with medical supplies to Italy". On 30 March, US President Donald Trump said that the US was to send $100 million worth of medical and hospital supplies to Italy.

After a phone call with Conte, Russian president Vladimir Putin arranged the Russian army to send medical help to Italy. On 22 March 2020, Russia sent nine military transport planes with eight mobile brigades of military medics, a team of about one hundred military virologists and epidemiologists, special disinfection vehicles, and other medical equipment and pharmaceuticals to Italy. The fuselage of the plane also carried a message for the nation, which read: "From Russia with Love". President of Lombardy Attilio Fontana and Italian Foreign Minister Luigi Di Maio expressed their gratitude for the aid.

The US-based evangelical group Samaritan's Purse opened a coronavirus field hospital in the parking lot of Cremona hospital.

On 24 March, Germany took in six coronavirus patients from the Bergamo hospital to be treated in Saxony. Later the same week, the German health minister said that Germany would take in a total of at least 47 Italian patients.
On 25 March, a C-130 from Ramstein Air Base in Germany delivered humanitarian supplies to Aviano Air Base.

Somalia sent twenty volunteer doctors to Italy to help fight COVID-19. Albania also sent a group of thirty medical staff members to Lombardy. Serbia sent four planes carrying medical equipment to Italy.

On 2 December 2020, a  team of 20 doctors and nurses of from the Sheba Medical Center in Israel flew to Italy to help a Piedmont District hospital cope with a surge in COVID-19 patients.

Foreign cases linked to Italy 

A number of COVID-19 cases emerged worldwide that were linked to Italy, and especially to the northern regions.

Africa 
The first cases in Algeria, CAR, Côte d'Ivoire, Morocco, Nigeria, Senegal, the Seychelles, South Africa and Tunisia were all linked to Italy.

Americas 
First or early cases in Argentina, Bolivia, Brazil, Canada, Chile, Colombia, Cuba, the Dominican Republic, Guatemala, Mexico, the United States, Uruguay and Venezuela were linked to Italy.

Asia 
Armenia – Armenia confirmed that three cases were imported from Italy on 12 March.

Azerbaijan – On 11 March a student tested positive after developing fever in Italy.

Bangladesh – On 8 March, Bangladesh confirmed its first cases; two are Bangladeshis who had returned from Italy and another is a family member of one of the two who returned.

India – On 2 March, New Delhi confirmed its first case, an Indian national who had returned from Italy. On the same day, an Italian tourist who had arrived in Jaipur, Rajasthan on 29 February tested positive in a second test after having previously tested negative. On 3 March, his wife also tested positive. On 4 March 14 more Italian tourists who were kept at a quarantine facility in Delhi were confirmed positive, as well as the group's Indian driver. A Paytm employee in Gurgaon who had returned from a vacation in Italy also tested positive. On 8 March, five members of a family in Kerala tested positive, three of whom had returned from Italy.

Israel – On 27 February, Israel confirmed that a man who had returned from Italy on 23 February tested positive. On 28 February, his wife also tested positive.

Japan – On 13 March, Japan confirmed that a man who had been in Italy since 6 January tested positive for coronavirus upon landing at Haneda Airport in Tokyo that day.

Jordan – On 2 March, Jordan confirmed that a man who had returned from Italy two weeks earlier had tested positive, with other potential cases under observation.

Mainland China – On 1 March, Qingtian County, Lishui, Zhejiang confirmed its first imported case, a 31-year-old Chinese woman who had worked at a restaurant in Bergamo. On 2 March, seven more imported cases were confirmed in Qingtian County that are related to the first imported case. Beijing reported one imported case on 3 March, four on 5 March, three on 6 March, one on 7 March and five on March. On 4 March, Deqing County, Huzhou, Zhejiang confirmed two new imported cases from Italy. On 10 March, Shanghai confirmed two new imported cases from Italy. They are native in Fujian and work in Italy. Qingdao, Shandong also confirmed the first imported case from Italy. On 11 March, Zhengzhou, Henan confirmed the first imported case, who stay in Italy. On 12 March, Shanghai confirmed one more imported case. On 13 March, Shanghai confirmed four more imported cases. On 14 March, Shanghai confirmed one more imported case, and Beijing also confirmed one more imported case from Italy. On 15 March, Beijing confirmed two more imported cases, and Shanghai also confirmed one more. On 16 March, Shanghai and Guangxi separately confirmed one more imported case from Italy. On 20 March, Beijing confirmed one more imported case.

Malaysia – On 28 February, Malaysia confirmed that an Italian who was married to a Malaysian tested positive and was admitted to Sungai Buloh Hospital. He was in Italy from 15 to 21 February for work.

Maldives – The Maldives' first cases were two staffers at Kuredu Island Resort who caught the disease from an Italian tourist who had returned to Italy and tested positive there.

Oman – A case was recorded of a patient who had travelled to Milan.

Philippines – On 23 March, a 61-year-old woman with a travel history to Italy became Baguio's first confirmed case of COVID-19 (Case 110).

Saudi Arabia – On 14 March, Saudi Arabia announced 17 new cases, including some citizens who had recently travelled to Italy.

Singapore – On 7 March, eight new cases of infection were confirmed in Singapore, one of which was a 36 year old Italian man (Case 136).

South Korea – On 28 February, South Korea confirmed that a 38-year-old man living in Gwangjin who visited Milan from 19 to 24 February was admitted to Seoul Medical Centre.

Sri Lanka – A group of infected Italian tourists passed on the disease to a 52-year-old tour guide.

Thailand – On 5 March, Thailand announced that its 44th and 45th confirmed cases, a 29-year-old Italian and 42-year-old Thai, had arrived in Thailand from Italy on 2 March. Both were admitted in Chonburi Province.

United Arab Emirates – On 28 February, two Italian staff members of the UAE Tour, tested positive.

Vietnam – Case 17 had travelled to Italy (as well as to France and the UK).

Europe 
Albania – On 9 March 2020, Albania confirmed its first two cases, a father and son, of which the son had traveled from Florence, Italy. On 10 March, 6 out of the 10 new cases were close contacts of the first 2.

Andorra – On 2 March, Andorra registered its first case, a man who had been to Milan.

Austria – On 25 February, Austria confirmed its first two cases, a man and a woman who had visited their hometown in Bergamo, who tested positive and were treated at a hospital in Innsbruck, Tyrol. On 27 February, a couple who tested positive and their two children who were showing symptoms were admitted to Kaiser-Franz-Josef Hospital. The family was previously on holiday in Lombardy. On 28 February, one of the children, a 15-year-old boy, tested positive.

Belgium – Nine patients diagnosed with the virus had travelled from Northern Italy. Belgium has confirmed that there are many more and that Italy is the source of most of its cases.

Belarus – A case was confirmed as having been imported from Italy.

Bosnia and Herzegovina – A man working in Italy transmitted the virus to his child.

Croatia – On 25 February, Croatia confirmed its first case, a man who had until 21 February stayed in Milan. On 26 February, the man's brother tested positive and a Croatian man who worked in Parma, Italy also tested positive and was admitted to a hospital in Rijeka.

Cyprus – One of the country's first two cases had a travel history to Milan.

Czechia – On 1 March, Czechia confirmed its first three cases. As of 8 March 24, 31 confirmed cases in the country have links to Italy, leading the government to institute a mandatory quarantine for all persons with a history of recent travel to Italy.

Denmark – On 27 February, Denmark confirmed its first case, a man who had returned from a ski holiday in Valmalenco, Sondrio, and quarantined at home. On 28 February, a man who had returned from a ski holiday in Northern Italy on 15 February tested positive in Copenhagen and was placed in home quarantine. On 29 February, an employee at the Aarhus University Hospital who had been to a conference in Munich, Germany, where he had met an infected person from Italy, tested positive. On 3 March, five people who had returned from Northern Italy tested positive.

Estonia – On 3 March, Estonia confirmed its second case, a patient who had arrived on 29 February from Bergamo and was travelling through Riga Airport. Two other Estonian passengers from the same flight and one returnee from Bergamo arriving through Tallinn Airport tested positive on 5 March. Two cases in Saaremaa were confirmed on 10 March: the patients had been in contact with the Power Volley Milano team members during the 2019–2020 CEV Challenge Cup matches held in Saaremaa on 4 and 5 March. On 9 March 5 Milan players had been diagnosed with fever before a league match. The infected in Saaremaa included the CEO of the Saaremaa VK volleyball club. Saare County quickly became the worst hit part of the country.

Finland – On 26 February, Finland confirmed that a Finnish woman who had visited Milan and was back in Finland on 22 February tested positive at the Helsinki University Central Hospital. On 28 February, a Finnish woman who had travelled to Northern Italy tested positive at the Helsinki and Uusimaa Hospital District and was placed in home isolation.

France – On 25 February, France confirmed that a man from La Balme-de-Sillingy who had returned from a trip to Lombardy on 15 February tested positive and was treated at Centre Hospitalier Annecy-Genevois, Épagny-Metz-Tessy. His wife also tested positive and was admitted to the same hospital. On 26 February 2020, a 36-year-old man who had made multiple trips to Lombardy tested positive and was treated at Nouvel Hôpital Civil, Strasbourg. On 27 February 2020, a daughter and a friend of the infected couple from La Balme-de-Sillingy were confirmed positive. An Italian man living in Montpellier who had just returned from Italy was admitted to Centre Hospitalier Universitaire. A person who had travelled to Italy was admitted to Hôpital Bichat, Paris. On 28 February 2020, two relatives of the infected couple from La Balme-de-Sillingy tested positive. A 23-year-old fashion student from Nice who had recently returned from Milan tested positive at Nice University Hospital Centre and was admitted to Hôpital l'Archet.

Germany – On 25 February 2020, Germany confirmed that a 25-year-old man from Göppingen, Baden-Württemberg who recently returned from Milan tested positive and was treated in Klinik am Eichert. On 26 February 2020, the man's 24-year-old girlfriend and her 60-year-old father, a chief physician at University Hospital Tübingen, tested positive and were admitted to the same hospital. A 32-year-old man from Rottweil, Baden-Württemberg who had visited Codogno with his family on 23 February tested positive and was admitted to a hospital for isolation. On 27 February, Bavaria confirmed that a man from Middle Franconia tested positive after having contact with an Italian man who later tested positive. Baden-Württemberg confirmed that two women and a man from Breisgau-Hochschwarzwald and Freiburg, respectively, tested positive. They had contact with an Italian participant at a business meeting in Munich who tested positive in Italy. A man from Böblingen who had had contact with the girlfriend of the patient from Göppingen also tested positive. On 28 February, a man from Freiburg who had travelled to Bergamo tested positive and underwent isolation. A man from Rhine-Neckar was admitted to the University Hospital Heidelberg. A 32-year-old man in Heilbronn who was in Milan on 21 February fell ill and was admitted to a hospital. As of 27 March 2020 Germany recorded 1443 cases directly linked to Italy

Georgia – On 28 February 2020, Georgia confirmed that a 31-year-old Georgian woman who had travelled to Italy tested positive and was admitted to Infectious Diseases Hospital in Tbilisi.

Greece – On 26 February 2020, Greece confirmed its first case, a 38-year-old woman from Thessaloniki who had recently visited Northern Italy and was admitted to AHEPA University Hospital. On 27 February, her 9-year-old child tested positive and was admitted to the same hospital. A 40-year-old woman from Athens who had travelled to Italy tested positive. On 28 February, a 36-year-old woman from Athens who had recently travelled to Italy tested positive. Both were admitted to the Attikon University General Hospital.

Hungary – Three of the seven cases in Hungary reported to date are linked to Italy.

Iceland – On 28 February 2020, Iceland confirmed its first case, an Icelandic male in his 50s who had previously been to Northern Italy and was placed in strict isolation in Landspítali in Reykjavík. On 5 March, a total of 34 cases had been confirmed in Iceland, most of which are imported cases from Italy.

Ireland – On 27 February 2020, Ireland's first case was confirmed by the Health Protection Surveillance Centre. The male patient had travelled to an affected region in Northern Italy. A second, unrelated case was confirmed on 3 March, a female in the eastern portion of Ireland who had travelled to Italy.

Latvia – On 2 March, Latvia confirmed its first case, a person who had travelled from Milan to Munich and then to Riga on 29 February.

Lithuania – On 28 February, Lithuania confirmed its first case, a 39-year-old woman who arrived in Kaunas from Verona.

Luxembourg – The nation's second and fourth cases were persons who had travelled to Italy.

Malta – A 12-year-old Italian brought the infection to Malta.

Moldova – On 7 March, Moldova confirmed its first case, a 48-year-old woman who had returned from Italy. Moldova confirmed the existence of imported case from diseased Italy on 11 March.

Netherlands – On 27 February, the Netherlands confirmed its first case, a man who had been in Lombardy and was admitted to Elisabeth-TweeSteden Hospital in Tilburg. On 28 February, a woman from Amsterdam who had visited Lombardy was in home isolation in Diemen.

North Macedonia – On 26 February, North Macedonia confirmed its first case, a woman who tested positive at the Clinic for Infectious Diseases, Skopje. She had stayed in Italy for a month and had been sick for two weeks. Upon returning to North Macedonia, she immediately reported to the clinic.

Norway – On 27 February, Norway confirmed that two people who tested positive were linked to the outbreak in Italy. They were quarantined at home in Oslo. On 28 February, an individual from Bergen and an employee of Oslo University Hospital, Ullevål tested positive and were placed in home isolation. Both had visited Northern Italy. On 6 March, the Norwegian Institute of Public Health reported that 79 of the 113 confirmed cases in Norway were linked to the outbreak in northern Italy.

Poland – Of the country's first five cases, two were from Italy, two were from Germany and one was from the UK.

Portugal – On 2 March, a doctor who had travelled to Northern Italy and became ill on 29 February was confirmed positive at Hospital de São João in Porto. On 4 March, a 44-year-old man who had travelled to Italy was confirmed positive at the same hospital.

Romania – On 26 February, Romania confirmed its first case, a man from Gorj who tested positive after having come in contact with a 71-year-old man from Cattolica, Italy. The Italian man visited his wife's family and had several business meetings in Romania from 18 to 22 February. The Romanian man was admitted to National Institute of Infectious Diseases Prof. Dr. Matei Balș in Bucharest. On 28 February, a 45-year-old man from Maramureș who had returned from Italy on 25 February was admitted to the Clinic of Infectious Diseases and then transferred to Cluj. A 38-year-old woman who had returned from Bergamo tested positive was admitted to a hospital in Timișoara. On 3 March, a 47-year-old man who had travelled in the same plane with the 38-year-old woman was confirmed positive and admitted to the same hospital. The majority of confirmed cases in Romania are related to Italy.

Russia – On 2 March, a Russian citizen who had returned from Italy was diagnosed.

San Marino – On 27 February, San Marino confirmed its first case, an 88-year-old man with pre-existing medical conditions who was hospitalised at Rimini Hospital.

Serbia – On 6 March, Serbia registered its first case, a 43-year-old man who had been to Budapest and Italy. At least one other case had been to Italy.

Slovakia – An asymptomatic man who had travelled to Venice between 14 and 15 February transmitted the virus to his father and his wife.

Slovenia – Many Slovenian cases are linked to Italy, including the nation's first case.

Spain – On 24 February, a 69-year-old medical doctor from Lombardy who had been vacationing in Tenerife since 17 February tested positive at the University Hospital of the Nuestra Señora de Candelaria. A 25-year-old man returning from a holiday in Italy also tested positive in Asturias. On 25 February, the wife of the doctor from Lombardy tested positive and was admitted to the same hospital where her husband was being treated. A 36-year-old Italian woman living in Barcelona who had visited Bergamo and Milan from 12 to 22 February also tested positive. A man from Villarreal who had recently travelled to Milan tested positive and was admitted to Hospital Universitario de La Plana. A 24-year-old man from Madrid who had recently returned from Northern Italy tested positive and was admitted to Hospital Carlos III. On 26 February, two Italian tourists who were vacationing with the Lombardy doctor and his wife also tested positive. The group were transferred to University Hospital of the Nuestra Señora de Candelaria and underwent quarantine. A 22-year-old man from Barcelona who travelled to Milan between 22 and 25 February tested positive and was admitted to Hospital Clínic. A woman from La Gomera who travelled to Italy between 4 and 8 February tested positive and was admitted to Hospital General de La Gomera in Tenerife. On 27 February, a 44-year-old man from Valencia who worked as a sportswriter and had travelled to Milan's San Siro Stadium on 19 February to watch a football game tested positive and was admitted to Hospital Clínico Universitario de València. Two other people with whom he had made contact also tested positive and were admitted to the same hospital. Two more people who had visited the same football game in Milan were hospitalised at the same place. A woman who had visited Milan was hospitalised at Hospital de Sagunto, Valencia. An Italian student studying in Valencia who had visited Northern Italy was admitted to Hospital Universitario Doctor Peset. A 22-year-old woman from Tenerife who had travelled to Italy from 19 to 25 February was admitted to Hospital Clínic. An 18-year-old Italian student studying at IE University, Segovia, who had just returned from Milan, was admitted to Hospital General de Segovia. On 28 February, a 27-year-old man from Aragon with a history of recent trips to Milan tested positive.

Sweden – On 26 February, Sweden confirmed that a 30-year-old man who previously visited Northern Italy fell ill three days after returning to Sweden and was admitted to Sahlgrenska University Hospital in Gothenburg. On 27 February, three patients in their 30s were confirmed positive in Västra Götaland. Two of them had been in contact with the Gothenburg patient, while the other had previously visited Italy. On 28 February, a man in his 50s who had returned from Northern Italy on 24 February tested positive and was admitted to a hospital in Jönköping.

Switzerland – On 25 February, Switzerland confirmed its first case, a 70-year-old man in the canton of Ticino who had previously visited Milan. On 27 February, a 28-year-old IT worker from Geneva who had recently returned from Milan tested positive and was admitted to Geneva University Hospital. Two Italian children on vacation in Graubünden tested positive and were hospitalised. A 26-year-old man in Aargau who had visited Verona on a business trip the previous week tested positive and was hospitalised. A 30-year-old woman who visited Milan was admitted to a hospital in Zurich. A young woman who had travelled to Milan tested positive in Basel-City. She worked for a daycare centre in Riehen, and after her test was confirmed, the children at the daycare were put into a two-week quarantine. On 28 February, her partner, a 23-year-old man, also tested positive in Basel-Country. On 29 February, the man's mother tested positive as well. On 28 February, a 45-year-old-man who had travelled to Milan tested positive in Zürich.

Ukraine – On 3 March, Ukraine confirmed its first case in Chernivtsi, a man who had travelled from Italy by plane to the Romanian city of Suceava and then to Ukraine by car with his wife.

United Kingdom – On 27 February, the United Kingdom confirmed that a patient who had visited Milan tested positive and was admitted to Royal Free Hospital in London. Northern Ireland reported its first case, an adult who had travelled from Northern Italy via Dublin and was admitted to Royal Victoria Hospital in Belfast. On 28 February, Wales reported its first case, a patient who had returned from northern Italy was treated at a specialist unit in England.

Oceania 
New Zealand – On 4 March, the New Zealand Ministry of Health confirmed its second case, a woman in her 30s who returned to Auckland from Northern Italy.

International aid received in Italy 
The Italian government requested medical equipment from the European Union Civil Protection Mechanism and on 11 March complained about the slow response of other European countries. Italy's Permanent Representative to the European Union, Maurizio Massari, wrote: "Unfortunately, not a single EU country has responded to the Commission's appeal".

Since the beginning of March, the German government limited the export of essential products to its national health service. Italian distributors were informed that they could not be supplied with surgical gowns, protective masks, goggles or visors. France imposed similar export restrictions and Jens Spahn defended Germany's decision.

References 

COVID-19 pandemic in Italy
International responses to the COVID-19 pandemic